Edward E. Haigh   (February 7, 1867 – February 13, 1953) was a 19th-century Major League Baseball outfielder.  He played for the St. Louis Browns of the National League in 1892.

External links
Baseball-Reference page

1867 births
1953 deaths
19th-century baseball players
Major League Baseball outfielders
St. Louis Browns (NL) players
Baseball players from Pennsylvania
Reading Actives players